The 2018 Szuperkupa (known as the TippMix Férfi Szuperkupa for sponsorship reasons). It was played on 22 December 2018 in Budapest, Hungary. With Ferencvárosi TC winning both the 2017–18 Országos Bajnokság I championship and the 2017 Magyar Kupa cup winners Szolnoki Dózsa.

Teams

Squads

Head coach: Zsolt Varga; 

Head coach: Živko Gocić;

Match

See also
2018–19 Országos Bajnokság I (National Championship of Hungary)
2018 Magyar Kupa (National Cup of Hungary)

References

External links
 Hungarian Water Polo Federaration

Seasons in Hungarian water polo competitions
Hungary
Szuperkupa Men